Blaž Škrinjarić (1520s-1592) was a city notary and judge in Varaždin and a member of the Varaždin literary circle.

Early life and career 
Škrinjarić was born in the mid or late 1520s in a place near Varaždin. After he was educated in Habsburg Kingdom of Hungary Škrinjarić first worked as a teacher in a school in Aszalo and later as a rector of a school in Varaždin. He was also a notary and judge in Varaždin. He reached the position of a president of the octaval court.

Trial 
In 1588 Škrinjarić was accused of committing adultery with a certain Uršula Geljanić and for being a father of the child she gave birth to three years after her husband died. Škrinjarić was stripped of all judicial privileges and forced to hand over the key and stamp of the city to the new judge. Geljanić was taken to prison but managed to escape. After Škrinjarić was accused for helping her escape he found her and brought her to trial where she swore that she had no relation with him. Based on the court's decision, Geljanić was "put into shackles" in the house of the city guardian to be tortured to confess who was the father of her child. Škrinjarić was released of accusations because he swore innocence, while the fate of the widow Geljanić is unknown.

Bibliography 
In 1587 Škrinjarić published his Latin language work De Agno Paschali in the Printing House of Ivan Manlius. A copy of this work can be found in the University Library in Budapest. Škrinjarić dedicated this book to Antun Vramec. The relation between Škrinjarić and Vramec corresponded to the relation between a student and his teacher. Although he published his only work on Latin language and there is no single sentence he wrote using Kajkavian dialect, because of the influence on the other members of the Varaždin literary circle, he is frequently connected with first written Kajkavian works.

References

Sources

Further reading 
  (copy at Google Books, not accessible in the EU)
  (another copy, digitised and freely accessible at the dLib.si, portal of the Digital library of Slovenia)

1520 births
1592 deaths